Amparo is a Portuguese and Spanish word that means refuge or shelter (and in a broader sense, protection). Several places in the Iberian Peninsula and in Latin America are named Amparo, some associated with Our Lady of the Refuge (Portiiirdr dr.: Nossa Senhora do Amparo, Esp: Nuestra Señora del Amparo). Sometimes spelled Ámparo (in Spanish).

Origin
On 24 February 1409, the Venerable Joan Gilabert Jofré of the Military Order of Our Lady of Mercy was en route to Valencia's Cathedral to deliver a Lenten sermon when he witnessed a mentally ill man being lynched. In response, his Order founded a hospice in 1410 with help from Roman Catholic confreres for the mentally ill under the invocation of Sancta dels Folls Doña Nostra i Desamparats Innocents (Our Lady of the insane and the innocent; sometimes translated as Our Lady of the forsaken), whose goal was to help people with mental illness. It has been claimed that this was the first psychiatric hospital in the world. 

Due to the famine of the period and the high rate of orphans due to the plague, the streets were filled with orphans. The hospice was soon expanded to assist orphans and foundlings, many the result of the plague.

People with the name

Given name
 Amparo Acker-Palmer (born 1968), Spanish biologist
 Amparo Alvajar (1916–1998), Spanish journalist, dramatist, and writer
 Amparo Arozamena (1916–2009), Mexican actress
 Amparo Arrebato (1944–2004), Colombian dancer
 Amparo Baró (1937–2015), Spanish actress
 Amparo Cabanes Pecourt (born 1938), Spanish academic and politician
 Amparo Caicedo (born 1965), Colombian sprinter
 Amparo Cuevas (1931–2012), Spanish Roman Catholic seer
 Amparo Custodio (1918–1993), Filipino comedian and actress
 Amparo Dávila (born 1928), Mexican writer
 Amparo Garcia-Crow, Mexican-American filmmaker
 Amparo Grisales (born 1956), Colombian actress
 Amparo Illana (1934–2001), wife of Spanish politician Adolfo Suárez
 Amparo Iturbi (1898–1969), Spanish concert pianist
 Amparo Lim (born 1969), Filipino badminton player
 Amparo Llanos (born 1965), Spanish musician
 Amparo Menendez-Carrion (born 1949), Uruguayan-Ecuadorian academic
 Amparo Montes (1920–2002), Mexican singer
 Amparo Moraleda Martínez (born 1964), Spanish business executive
 Amparo Muñoz (1954–2011), Spanish actress
 Amparo Noguera born 1965), Chilean television and film actress
 Amparo Ochoa (1946–1994), Mexican singer-songwriter
 Ámparo Otero Pappo (1896–1987), Cuban milliner honored as Righteous Among the Nations
 Amparo Pacheco (1924–2017), Spanish actress
 Amparo Poch y Gascón (1902–1968), Spanish anarchist
 Amparo Rivelles (1925–2013), Spanish actress
 Amparo Rubiales (born 1945), Spanish politician
 Amparo Rubín (born 1955), Mexican singer
 Amparo Sánchez, Spanish musician
 Amparo Soler Leal (1933–2013), Spanish actress
 Amparo Valle (1939–2016), Spanish actress

Surname
 Ely do Amparo (1921–1991), Brazilian footballer
 Kristin Amparo (born 1983), Swedish singer

References

External links
 http://www.actaspsiquiatria.es/repositorio/9/49/ESP/9-49-ESP-1-9-857704.pdf

Portuguese feminine given names
Spanish feminine given names